Hardcore Pawn is an American reality television series that aired on truTV that followed the day-to-day operations of American Jewelry and Loan, a family-owned and operated pawn shop in Detroit, Michigan's 8 Mile Road corridor. The series, which was preceded by two pilot episodes in 2009, premiered on August 16, 2010.

Wild

Series overview 

Over nine seasons, 162 episodes (including the pilots and specials) have aired.

Episodes

Pilot episodes (2009)

Season 1 (2010)

Season 2 (2010/11)

Season 3 (2011)

Season 4 (2011)

Season 5 (2011/12)

Season 6 (2012/13)

Season 7 (2013)

Season 8 (2013/14)

Season 9 (2014/15)

References 

General references

External links 
 
 American Jewelry and Loan

Hardcore Pawn